Catholic Action is the name of groups of lay Catholics who advocate for increased Catholic influence on society. They were especially active in the nineteenth century in historically Catholic countries under anti-clerical regimes such as Spain, Italy, Bavaria, France, and Belgium. 

In 1934, Adolf Hitler ordered the murder of Erich Klausener, head of a Catholic Action group in Nazi Germany, during the Night of the Long Knives. 

Catholic Action is not a political party in and of itself; however, in many times and places, the distinction between a lay organization of the faithful and a political movement has blurred. Since World War II the concept has often been supplanted by Christian Democrat parties that were organised to combat Communist parties and promote Catholic social justice principles in places such as Italy and West Germany.

Catholic Action generally includes various subgroups for youth, women, workers, etc.  In the postwar period, the various national Catholic Action organizations for workers formed the World Movement of Christian Workers, which remains active today as a voice within the Church and in society for working class Catholics.

History
The Catholic Action movement has its beginnings in the latter part of the 19th century as efforts to counteract a rise in anti-clerical sentiment, especially in Europe.

A variety of diverse groups formed under the concept of Catholic Action. These include the Young Christian Workers, the Young Christian Students; the Cursillo movement, RENEW International; the Legion of Mary; Sodalities; the Christian Family Movement; various community organizing groups like COPS (Communities Organized for Public Service) in San Antonio, and Friendship House in Harlem, an early influence on Thomas Merton.

Examples

Around 1912, as a curate in a parish in Laeken, on the outskirts of Brussels, Joseph Cardijn, who dedicated his ministry to aid the working class, founded for the young seamstresses a branch of the Needleworkers' Trade Union.   
In 1919 he founded the Young Trade Unionists. In 1924, the name of the organization was changed to "Jeunesse Ouvrière Chrétienne", the Young Christian Workers. JOC grew  throughout the world; its members were often known as "Jocists" (the movement was often called "Jocism"). By 1938, there were 500,000 members throughout Europe; in 1967, this had increased to 2,000,000 members in 69 countries.

A fruit of the contemporary Catholic Action movement, the International Catholic Union of the Press UCIP was founded in Belgium in 1927. A year later, the Organization Catholique Internationale du Cinéma (OCIC) was founded in The Netherlands, and the Bureau Catholic International de Radiodiffusion (BCIR), in Germany. It became Unda in 1946.  Members of these professional Catholic lay associations, working in the world of the professional media, wanted to unite their efforts against the perceived secularization of society. On the one hand, they believed that the press and the new media of radio and cinema were contributing to secularization. On the other hand, they participated in the secular media in order to use them as a new means of evangelization. They answered a call from God through the church to evangelize the secular mass media, or at least endow them with Gospel values. As a result of the merger of the Catholic media organizations OCIC and Unda, a new organisation was founded in 2001 in Rome called SIGNIS. In 2014 the Holy See suggested that SIGNIS should also integrate the members of the former  International Catholic Union of the Press (UCIP).

Australia

The National Civic Council is an Australian Catholic Action group formed in 1957 out of the Australian Catholic social studies movement under the leadership of B.A. Santamaria. Precursors to the NCC were active in the Australian Labor Party, but were expelled from the party by less conservative members during the 1955 Labor Split. The expelled members of the party went on to form the Australian Labor Party (Anti-Communist) and the subsequent Democratic Labor Party.

Chile
In Chile, Catholic Action was the name of a nationwide youth movement. Under the aegis of Saint Alberto Hurtado it was responsible for the founding of the Chilean Trade Union Association.

Italy

Azione Cattolica is probably the most active Catholic Action group still around today. Catholic Action was particularly well suited to Italy where Catholic party political action was impractical, firstly under the Anti-Clerical Savoyard regime from 1870 until about 1910 and later under the Fascist regime which prohibited independent political parties.

The present association Azione Cattolica was founded in 1867 by Mario Fani and Giovanni Acquaderni with the name of Società della Gioventù Cattolica Italiana (Italian Catholic Youth Society), then reformed during the Mussolini regime when the association was structured into 4 sectors and was called Azione Cattolica.

Catholic Action in other countries

Catholic Action was organised in many other countries, including:
 Argentina (still active)
 Brazil (see Alceu Amoroso Lima)
 Canada (see Catherine Doherty)
 Croatia (see Croatian Catholic movement)
 France (see La Croix)
 Ireland (see Legion of Mary)
 Lithuania (see Catholic Action Center)
 Malta (Azzjoni Kattolika Maltija)
 Mexico (Acción Católica Mexicana)
 New Zealand
 Poland (See Aleksander Cardinal Kakowski)
 Portugal
 Philippines (see Roman Catholic Archdiocese of Manila)
 South Korea
 Spain (still active), where it gave rise to Cursillo under the name Hermandad Obrera de Acción Católica
 United Kingdom
 United States (See Friendship House, Catholics for the Common Good and Catholic Worker Movement)

See also

Catholic social teaching
Corporatism
Political catholicism
Student Catholic Action
Pascual Abaj
Manuel Aparici Navarro
Bartolome Blanco Marquez, Youth leader of Catholic Action and martyr of the Spanish Civil War

Notes and references

Sources
 IL FERMO PROPOSITO (On Catholic Action in Italy), Pius X, 1905

External link

Anti-fascist organizations
Catholic advocacy groups